The Awi people are an ethnic group in Ethiopia and are one of the Agaw peoples. The Awi live in Agew Awi Zone in central Gojjam and have a few communities in the Metekel Zone of the Benishangul-Gumuz Region.

The Awi people are composed of seven subgroups, called Ankäša, Azäna, Chara, Qʷaqura, Banʤa, Zigän and Mätäkäl. All Awi groups are classified to the Agaw line. These Awi mainly live in the Agäw Awi Zone located central Gojjam (Amhara Region), whereas small numbers of Awi groups as well reside in Mätäkäl Zone, neighboring Benishangul-Gumuz Region.

Population 
The 2007 census lists 631,565 ethnic Awis, or 0.85% of the total population; 63,415 are urban inhabitants. The Awi Zone, according to the Central Statistical Agency, had roughly 990,000 inhabitants in 2005. Others living in that Zone are predominantly Amharas.

Language 
The Awis speak Awngi, one of the Agaw languages, which are part of the Cushitic subfamily within Afroasiatic. Agaw languages form the main substratum influence on Amharic and other Ethiopian Semitic languages, which are also Afroasiatic languages.

References

External links
 http://www.ethnologue.com/show_language.asp?code=awn

Ethnic groups in Ethiopia